Jason or Jay Allen may refer to:

Jason Allen (American football) (born 1983), American football cornerback
Jason Allen (cyclist) (born 1981), New Zealand cyclist
Jason Allen (politician), American politician in Michigan
Jason Allen (rugby league), Australian rugby league footballer of the 1990s
Jay Allen (1900–1972), American journalist
Jay Allen (baseball) (born c. 2003), American baseball player